Persan is a commune in the Val-d'Oise department, Île-de-France, northern France. Persan–Beaumont station has rail connections to Pontoise, Creil, Sarcelles and Paris.

Population

See also
Communes of the Val-d'Oise department

References

External links
Official website 
Association of Mayors of the Val d’Oise 

Communes of Val-d'Oise
Val-d'Oise communes articles needing translation from French Wikipedia